Max Trautz (19 March 1880 – 19 August 1960) was a German chemist. He was very productive with over 190 scientific publications especially in the field of chemical kinetics. He was the first to investigate the activation energy of molecules by connecting Max Planck's new results concerning light with observations in chemistry.

He is also known as the founder of collision theory together with the British scientist William Lewis. While Trautz published his work in 1916, Lewis published it in 1918. However, they  were unaware of each other's work due to World War I.

Publications
 Trautz, Max. Der Temperaturkoeffizient der spezifischen Wärme von Gasen, 1913
 Trautz, Max. Die Theorie der chemischen Reaktionsgeschwindigkeit und ein neues Grenzgesetz für ideale Gase, 1915
 Trautz, Max. Messungen der spezifischen Wärme von Co 2, Cl 2 und So 2, 1916
 Trautz, Max. Das Gesetz der Reaktionsgeschwindigkeit und der Gleichgewichte in Gasen. Bestätigung der Additivität von Cv-3/2R. Neue Bestimmung der Integrationskonstanten und der Moleküldurchmesser, Zeitschrift für anorganische und allgemeine Chemie, Volume 96, Issue 1, Pages 1 – 28, 1916
 Trautz, Max. Die Theorie der Gasreaktionen und der Molarwärmen und die Abweichungen von der Additivität der inneren Atomenergie, 1917
 Trautz, Max. Praktische Einführung in die Allgemeine Chemie, 1917
 Trautz, Max. Der Verlauf der chemischen Vorgänge im Dunkeln und im Licht, 1917.
 Trautz, Max. Die Einwirkung von Stickoxyd auf Chlor
 Trautz, Max. Die langsame Verbrennung des Jodwasserstoffgases
 Trautz, Max. Die Reibung, Wärmeleitung und Diffusion in Gasmischungen
 Trautz, Max. Lehrbuch der Chemie

References

20th-century German chemists
Scientists from Karlsruhe
1880 births
1960 deaths